Mohamed Saoud (born 31 December 1949) is a Moroccan boxer. He competed in the men's middleweight event at the 1976 Summer Olympics. At the 1976 Summer Olympics, he lost to David Odwell of Great Britain.

References

1949 births
Living people
Moroccan male boxers
Olympic boxers of Morocco
Boxers at the 1976 Summer Olympics
Competitors at the 1975 Mediterranean Games
Mediterranean Games silver medalists for Morocco
Place of birth missing (living people)
Mediterranean Games medalists in boxing
Middleweight boxers